Bridge Street Bridge, also known as Veterans Memorial Bridge, is a two-span Pratt through truss bridge that crosses the Grand River in Portland, Michigan, in the United States. Completed in 1890, it is the oldest known surviving example of a truss bridge built in the state by the Groton Bridge and Manufacturing Company.

Fabricated from iron and steel, Bridge Street Bridge replaced a wooden bridge that had been built at the same site in 1837–1838.

After being damaged by ice flows in the river, Bridge Street Bridge was closed to truck traffic in 1952. It was subsequently closed to all vehicular traffic in 1978 as a result of continued deterioration. The bridge was rehabilitated in 1990 using Critical Bridge funds from the Michigan Department of Transportation and the Federal Highway Administration, marking the first time that the state had used these funds for bridge restoration instead of bridge replacement.

Other vehicles crossing the river in Portland use the bridge at Grand River Avenue, which carries two-way traffic.

Bridge Street Bridge was designated as a Michigan Historic Civil Engineering Landmark by the American Society of Civil Engineers in 1991. The structure is included within the Portland Downtown Historic District.

See also
List of bridges documented by the Historic American Engineering Record in Michigan

References

External links

1890 establishments in Michigan
Bridges completed in 1890
Buildings and structures in Ionia County, Michigan
Historic American Engineering Record in Michigan
Metal bridges in the United States
Pratt truss bridges in the United States
Road bridges in Michigan